Patellapis vincta is a species of bee in the genus Patellapis, of the family Halictidae. It is endemic to Sri Lanka. The first specimen was found from Peradeniya area.

External links
 Atlashymenoptera.net
 Beesind.com Beesind.com
  Academia.edu
 Discoverlife.org
 Atlashymenoptera.net

Halictidae
Insects of Sri Lanka
Insects described in 1860